The Procedure and Privileges Committee is a select committee of the House of Lords in the Parliament of the United Kingdom. The remit of the committee is to review House procedure and privileges.

Membership
As of January 2023, the membership of the committee is as follows:

External links
 The records of the House of Lords Procedure Committee are held by the UK Parliamentary Archives

See also
List of Committees of the United Kingdom Parliament

References

Committees of the House of Lords